St. Stefan's Romanian Orthodox Church is a historic church built in 1924 in South St. Paul, Minnesota, United States.  It was built for Romanian American immigrants who worked in the meatpacking industry. It continues to serve as a Romanian Orthodox Church.

References

External links

 Saint Stephen Romanian Orthodox Church

Churches in Dakota County, Minnesota
Eastern Orthodox churches in Minnesota
Romanian Orthodox church buildings
Churches completed in 1924
20th-century Eastern Orthodox church buildings
Churches on the National Register of Historic Places in Minnesota
Romanian-American history
National Register of Historic Places in Dakota County, Minnesota